Koireng or Koiren is a Kuki-Chin-Mizo language spoken by Koireng people in Manipur, India. It is particularly close to Aimol, Purum and Kharam

Koren is almost entirely spoken in Manipur.

References

Languages of Manipur
Endangered languages of India
Southern Naga languages